This is a list of nature centers and environmental education centers in the state of Maine. 

To use the sortable tables: click on the icons at the top of each column to sort that column in alphabetical order; click again for reverse alphabetical order.

References

 Maine Environmental Education Association
 Maine Audubon

External links
Map of nature centers and environmental education centers in Maine

 
Nature centers
Maine